Diala semistriata is a species of sea snail, a marine gastropod mollusk in the family Dialidae.

Description
The shell size varies between 1.9 mm and 4.5 mm.

Distribution
This species is distributed in the Indian Ocean along South Africa, Aldabra Atoll and Madagascar, in the Western Pacific Ocean, in the Red Sea and in the Mediterranean Sea.

References

Further reading 
 Dautzenberg, Ph. (1929). Mollusques testacés marins de Madagascar. Faune des Colonies Francaises, Tome III
 Vine, P. (1986). Red Sea Invertebrates. Immel Publishing, London. 224 pp
 Gofas, S.; Le Renard, J.; Bouchet, P. (2001). Mollusca, in: Costello, M.J. et al. (Ed.) (2001). European register of marine species: a check-list of the marine species in Europe and a bibliography of guides to their identification. Collection Patrimoines Naturels, 50: pp. 180–213
 Streftaris, N.; Zenetos, A.; Papathanassiou, E. (2005). Globalisation in marine ecosystems: the story of non-indigenous marine species across European seas. Oceanogr. Mar. Biol. Annu. Rev. 43: 419–453

External links
 

Dialidae
Gastropods described in 1849